For its first nine seasons, 1960 through 1968, the American Football League determined its champion via a single playoff game between the winners of its two divisions (although ties in the standings in 1963 (Eastern) and 1968 (Western) necessitated a tiebreaker divisional playoff game the week before).

In 1969, the tenth and final year of the independent ten-team AFL, a four-team playoff was held, with the second-place teams in each division traveling to play the winner of the other division in what were called the "Interdivisional" playoffs.  These playoffs were not, and are not considered to have been, "wildcard" playoffs since the runners-up in both divisions qualified, rather than the two best non-division winners. (Had the 1969 playoffs been true wildcard playoffs, the Western's third-place team, San Diego (8–6–0), would have qualified while the Eastern's runner-up, Houston (6–6–2), would not have.) The 1969 AFL playoffs were only the second time a U.S. major professional football league allowed teams other than the first place teams (including ties) to compete in post-season playoffs (the first was the seven-team All-America Football Conference's 1949 four-team playoff).

Prior to the advent of the Super Bowl for the 1966 season, the AFL went to great lengths to avoid scheduling its playoffs head-to-head with the NFL.  In 1960, the NFL's game was held on Monday, December 26; the AFL had that week off, and played its title contest on Sunday, January 1, as the college bowl games were played on Monday. In 1961 and 1962, the AFL played its game during the off-week between the end of the NFL's regular season and its title game (thus resulting in the AFL holding championship games on December 24, 1961, and December 23, 1962, a week before the NFL's games of December 31, 1961, and December 30, 1962).  In 1963, the AFL held its Eastern Division tiebreaker playoff on Saturday, December 28, 1963, thereby avoiding the NFL championship game that Sunday (the AFL championship game was held on January 5).  In 1964, pro football had a championship weekend, with the AFL's title game held on Saturday, December 26, and the NFL championship on Sunday.  For 1965, the AFL tried to return to the practice of playing its game on a Sunday during the off-week between the NFL playoff, slating its championship contest for December 26, while the NFL's game was not held until January 2, 1966; the Colts and Packers required a Western Conference tiebreaker on the December 26, date --- and since that game went to overtime, the TV audience for the Bills–Chargers title game in San Diego was diminished considerably.  Even in 1966, the AFL originally scheduled its championship game for the off-week, planning to hold its playoff on Monday, December 26, six days before the NFL title game on January 1.

Negotiations prior to the first Super Bowl, in early December 1966, resulted in the two leagues agreeing to have championship doubleheaders for the next four years, with each holding its title game on the same day but staggered, so that television audiences could view both.  Thus the final four AFL championship games were held on the same day as the NFL championship game: January 1, 1967; December 31, 1967; December 29, 1968; and January 4, 1970.

The Pro Football Hall of Fame and the National Football League include AFL playoffs in their statistics for the NFL playoffs.

Championship summary

 Eastern Division hosted in even-numbered seasons, Western in odd.

1960 Championship

1961 Championship

1962 Championship

1963 Playoffs

A tie in the Eastern Division standings necessitated an Eastern Division playoff game

Eastern Division Playoff

1963 Championship

The Chargers championship win is noted for being the only and most recent major sports championship won for the city of San Diego. No other city with at least two professional sports teams has a championship drought as long, as of 2020 (57 years). This is also the only time that the Chargers have beaten the Patriots in a postseason game.

1964 Championship

Mike Stratton's hit on San Diego Chargers running back Keith Lincoln set the stage for the Buffalo Bills and their first AFL championship.

1965 Championship

This was the last AFL Championship Game before the Super Bowl era began the following season and the last time a final pro football championship game was played in December. It was also the most recent championship won by a Buffalo-based professional sports team.

1966 Championship

The Bills went into the 1966 AFL Championship having already won the game the previous two years. Though the game was to be played in Buffalo, the visiting Kansas City Chiefs were three-point favorites, mainly because of their explosive and innovative offense led by Head Coach Hank Stram. The Bills were a more conventional team with a solid defensive line and a running mindset on offense.

Kansas City dominated the game from start to finish, forcing four turnovers (without losing any themselves) and outscoring Buffalo 24–0 over the last three quarters.

On the opening kickoff, Fletcher Smith's short kick was fielded by defensive end Dudley Meredith, who promptly fumbled the ball, and KC punter Jerrel Wilson, who also played on the kick coverage team, recovered it for the Chiefs on the Bills 31-yard line. This led to the first score of the game, a 29-yard touchdown pass from Len Dawson to tight end Fred Arbanas. After an exchange of punts, Buffalo tied the game when receiver Elbert Dubenion raced ahead of defensive back Fred Williamson, caught a pass from Jack Kemp at the Chiefs 45, and raced all the way to the end zone for a 69-yard touchdown reception.

Later on, Mike Garrett's 27-yard punt return gave the Chiefs a first down on the Bills 45-yard line.  After a few plays, Dawson made a key 15-yard completion to Arbanas on the Buffalo 29. It was the last catch of the day for Arbanas, who ended up leaving the game with a separated shoulder, but it paid off big time as Dawson threw a 29-yard touchdown pass to Otis Taylor on the next play, giving the Chiefs a 14-7 second quarter lead. Buffalo responded with a drive deep into Chiefs territory, featuring Kemp's 30-yard completion to rookie receiver Rob Burnett on the Kansas City 12-yard line. But in what turned out to be one of the most crucial plays of the game, Kemp's next pass was intercepted in the end zone by safety Johnny Robinson, who returned it 72 yards to the Bills 28. Mike Mercer eventually cashed in the turnover with a 32-yard field goal that gave the Chiefs a 17-7 halftime lead.

The third quarter was a defensive struggle with each team punting twice. Near the end, Kansas City got the ball on the Bills 42-yard line, but failed to score when Mercer missed a 49-yard field goal attempt.

In the fourth quarter, the Chiefs put the game away with consecutive touchdown drives. First, Dawson's 45-yard completion to Chris Burford gave the team a first down on the Buffalo 4-yard line. Garrett then ran the ball on the next four plays, his last carry a 1-yard touchdown run. Then on the first play of Buffalo's next drive, receiver Glenn Bass lost a fumble that was recovered by Bobby Hunt and returned 21 yards to the Bills 20-yard line, leading to the final score of the game on Garrett's 18-yard touchdown burst.  Buffalo could do nothing with their next drive, and on their final one of the day, Kemp was intercepted by Emmitt Thomas.

Dawson was near perfect, completing 16/24 passes for 227 yards and two touchdowns, while also rushing for 28 yards. Garrett rushed for 39 yards and two touchdowns, caught 4 passes for 16 yards, returned a kickoff for 3 yards, and added another 37 yards on 3 punt returns. Kemp completed just 12/25 passes for 253 yards and a touchdown, with two interceptions. Burnett caught 6 passes for 127 yards.

1967 Championship

The Oakland Raiders were ten and a half point favorites over the Houston Oilers in the 1967 AFL Championship Game.  Quarterback Daryle Lamonica, acquired in a trade from the Buffalo Bills in the offseason, led the Raiders to a 13–1 record, throwing 30 touchdown passes in the process.  The Oilers went from last place in the Eastern Conference in 1966 to first in '67, beating out the New York Jets by a game.  Most of the Oilers' offense centered on big fullback Hoyle Granger, and a midseason quarterback trade for the shifty Pete Beathard (sending their own starter, Jacky Lee, to the Kansas City Chiefs) proved to be the spark that turned Houston's season around.

The previous meeting between the two teams had been a close game won 19-7 by the Raiders, with Lamonica struggling offensively.  This was not the case in the rematch.  Oakland took a 10–0 lead in the second quarter on a 69-yard run down the left sidelines by Hewritt Dixon, and on a fake field goal attempt Lamonica passed to Dave Kocourek for the 17-0 halftime margin.  Former Oilers quarterback George Blanda, who had led Houston to the AFL's first two championships, kicked four field goals for the Raiders.  Houston did not score until the fourth quarter, when they already trailed 30–0.

Oakland lost Super Bowl II to the NFL champion Green Bay Packers.

1968 Playoffs

A tie in the Western Division standings necessitated a Western Division playoff game

Western Division Playoff

1968 Championship

The Jets went on to win Super Bowl III to become the first AFL Super Bowl champion.

1969 Playoffs

Bracket

Interdivisional Playoffs

1969 Championship

This was the final AFL Championship Game, as well as the final game played between two AFL teams before the merger with the National Football League. The Chiefs won Super Bowl IV as the last AFL champion.

AFL Championship Game appearances 1960–1969

See also
AFC Championship Game

References

NFL Record and Fact Book
Total Football: The Official Encyclopedia of the National Football League

External links
'64 Title Game article from Billzone.com
Images from '62 Title Game at Wireimage.com